The United Kingdom of Great Britain and Northern Ireland competed at the 1992 Winter Paralympics held in Tignes and Albertville, France. The team was known by it shortened name of Great Britain, for identification purposes.

The British team entered athletes in all three disciplines contested at the Games; eleven in alpine skiing, four in biathlon and three in cross-country skiing. Five medals were won by British athletes, one silver and four bronze, meaning Britain placed fifteenth in the medal table. All five medals were won in alpine skiing events, two by Richard Burt and three by Matthew Stockford. In addition to the medal performances the team had fourteen top ten finishes.  The achievements of the British Paralympic team at the 1992 Winter Games helped to raise awareness of sports for disabled athletes.

Medallists

The following British athletes won medals at the Games. In total five medals were won, all in alpine skiing, and the team finished fifteenth in the medal table. This was the best medal total by Great Britain at a Winter Paralympics since 1984 in Innsbruck. In the 'by discipline' sections below, medallists' names are in bold.

Team selection and funding

The team was made up of athletes from the whole United Kingdom; athletes from Northern Ireland, who could later elect to hold Irish citizenship under the pre-1999 article 2 of the Irish constitution, were only eligible to represent Great Britain at this time. However no Northern Irish athletes took part in the Winter Paralympics until 2010 in Vancouver.

These were the first Games, along with the Summer Games in Barcelona, to be coordinated by the British Paralympic Association. Funding for elite training programmes came from the Paralympics Trust, which was set up with a £500,000 government grant.

Disability classification

Every participant at the Paralympics has their disability grouped into one of five disability categories; amputation, the condition may be congenital or sustained through injury or illness; cerebral palsy; wheelchair athletes, there is often overlap between this and other categories; visual impairment, including blindness; Les autres, any physical disability that does not fall strictly under one of the other categories, for example dwarfism or multiple sclerosis. Each Paralympic sport then has its own classifications, dependent upon the specific physical demands of competition. Events are given a code, made of numbers and letters, describing the type of event and classification of the athletes competing. Events with "B" in the code are for athletes with visual impairment, codes LW1 to LW9 are for athletes who stand to compete and LW10 to LW12 are for athletes who compete sitting down. In biathlon events, which contain a target shooting component, blind and visually impaired athletes are able to compete through the use of acoustic signals, whose signal intensity varies dependent upon whether or not the athlete is on target.

Alpine skiing

Eleven British alpine skiers took part in the Games, ten in the men's events and one in the women's. All five of Britain's medals at the Games were won in alpine skiing events. The team's only silver medal was won by Richard Burt in the giant slalom B3 classification and he also won a bronze in the super-G B3. Burt almost missed his silver medal run when race officials started prematurely resetting the slalom course, but Burt's sighted guide Keith Hockley noticed and took him up the mountain to complete the race. Matthew Stockford, the reigning world champion in downhill, won three bronze medals in the downhill, super-G and giant slalom events of the LW10 classification. After Stockford won the bronze in downhill, the British delegation filed a protest claiming that the two American skiers ahead of him should not have been in the LW10 category. The medical committee rejected the protest on the grounds that all classifications had been determined at the start of the competition.  Both Burt and Stockford would go on to win medals at the 1994 Winter Paralympics in Lillehammer.

Men

Women

Biathlon

Four British men competed in biathlon events, all of them in the visually impaired classifications. None of the athletes won a medal, the highest placed finisher being Peter Young who came sixth in the B1 . Young, James Brown and James Denton also competed in cross-country skiing events at the Games.
Men

Cross-country skiing

Three British men took part in cross-country skiing at the 1992 Games; all three also competed in biathlon events. Peter Young achieved the best finish in an individual event, sixth place in the 10 km B1, he had previously won a bronze medal in the event at the 1984 Innsbruck Games. Both Brown and Denton failed to place in the top ten in their individual events.

Men

See also
Great Britain at the Paralympics
Great Britain at the 1992 Winter Olympics

References

External links
 Results database at the International Paralympic Committee official website

Nations at the 1992 Winter Paralympics
1992
Paralympics
Winter sports in the United Kingdom